Cytokine receptor-like factor 3 is a protein that in humans is encoded by the CRLF3 gene.

Model organisms 

Model organisms have been used in the study of CRLF3 function. A conditional knockout mouse line, called Crlf3tm1a(KOMP)Wtsi was generated as part of the International Knockout Mouse Consortium program, a high-throughput mutagenesis project to generate and distribute animal models of disease to interested scientists. Male and female animals underwent a standardized phenotypic screen to determine the effects of deletion. Twenty six tests were carried out and two significant phenotypes were reported. Homozygous mutant female adults had a significant increase in circulating levels of fructosamine, while mutants of both sexes had decreased platelet cell numbers.

Function 
Although CRLF3 signaling pathways have not yet been fully characterized it is very likely that CRLF3 is a neuroprotective erythropoietin receptor.

Origin 
Phylogenetic analyses have shown that CRLF3 at first appeared in a common ancestor of Cnidaria and Bilateria and hence emerged with the origin of the nervous system.

References

External links

Further reading 
 
 
 
 
 
 
 
 
 

Genes mutated in mice